Queen of Asia may refer to:

 Queen of Asia (gem)
 
 Miss World
 Sen'un Ajia no Joō